Interventricular groove may refer to:
 Anterior interventricular sulcus, one of two grooves that separates the ventricles of the heart, near the left margin
 Posterior interventricular sulcus, one of the two grooves that separates the ventricles of the heart, near the right margin